The Association of Assistant Mistresses (AAM) was a trade union representing female teachers in British secondary schools.

The union was founded in 1884 as the Association of Assistant Mistresses in Secondary Schools Incorporated, the last part of the name later being dropped.  Membership of the union grew steadily, reaching 1,000 in 1910, and 39,000 in 1978.  That year, single sex unions were banned, and the AAM accordingly merged with the Assistant Masters' Association, forming the Assistant Masters' and Mistresses' Association.

General Secretaries
M. Quarrier Hogg
1921: U. Gordon Wilson
c.1943: O. M. Hastings
1960: Sheila Wood

References

Teacher associations based in the United Kingdom
Trade unions established in 1884
Trade unions disestablished in 1978
Trade unions based in London